This is a list of public art in the London Borough of Havering.

Coldharbour

Harold Hill

Hornchurch

Rainham

Romford

Upminster

References

External links
 

Havering
Havering
Tourist attractions in the London Borough of Havering